2015/16 Summit Sportsman Series is an Australian National Drag Racing Association sanctioned drag racing series in Australia for sportsman racers in Group 2, 3 and 4 classes, the series is televised on SBS Speedweek on Sundays 2pm. Replays can be watched via SBS On Demand or online through Motorsports TV[1], ANDRA Catch Up TV and Speedweek.com.au[2]

The series is run on both 1/4 mile drag strips and 1/8 mile drag strips travelling to regional towns and cities, the championship is sponsored by Summit Racing Equipment.

2015/16 Summit Sportsman Series Calendar

2015/16 Summit Sportsman Series Results

See also

Motorsport in Australia
List of Australian motor racing series

References

External links

Drag racing events
2015 in Australian motorsport
2016 in Australian motorsport